Kevin J. O'Brien (born October 26, 1955) is a Canadian politician. Born in Cape Breton Island Nova Scotia, O'Brien is a union negotiator, former civil servant and a  former municipal and territorial level politician who has served as a Member of both the Northwest Territories Legislature and the Nunavut Legislature. He served as Speaker of the Legislative Assembly of Nunavut from 2000 to 2004.

Biography 
O'Brien was first elected to the Northwest Territories Legislature in the 1995 Northwest Territories general election. He defeated incumbent MLA Silas Arngna'naaq to win the Kivallivik electoral district. He served a single term in the Legislature before Northwest Territories and Nunavut were split and his electoral district was abolished.

O'Brien ran for a seat in the first Nunavut general election held in 1999. He won the  Arviat electoral district and became its first member. O'Brien was elected Speaker of the House in 2000 and held it until his defeat in the 2004 Nunavut general election. He was defeated by David Alagalak in a hotly contested race finishing a distant fourth.

During the 2004 election, O'Brien  was fined for possession of alcohol in Arviat, Nunavut, a dry community. The fine was publicized after the election.

In 2011, O'Brien sought the Liberal Party of Canada nomination for North Vancouver, but lost to Taleeb Noormohamed.

References

External links
Saskatchewan Legislative Assembly Hansard Guest Introductions April 21, 2001

1956 births
Members of the Legislative Assembly of the Northwest Territories
Members of the Legislative Assembly of Nunavut
21st-century Canadian politicians
Living people
People from Arviat
People from Glace Bay
Speakers of the Legislative Assembly of Nunavut
Dalhousie University alumni
University of North Texas alumni